The 2017 Copa CONMEBOL Libertadores (officially the Copa CONMEBOL Libertadores Bridgestone 2017 for sponsorship reasons) was the 58th edition of the CONMEBOL Libertadores (also referred to as the Copa Libertadores), South America's premier club football tournament organized by CONMEBOL.

Grêmio defeated Lanús in the finals by an aggregate score of 3–1 to win their third tournament title. As champions, they qualified as the CONMEBOL representative at the 2017 FIFA Club World Cup in the United Arab Emirates, and also earned the right to play against the winners of the 2017 Copa Sudamericana in the 2018 Recopa Sudamericana. They also automatically qualified for the 2018 Copa Libertadores group stage.

Atlético Nacional were the defending champions, but they were eliminated in the group stage.

Format changes
Starting from this season, the following format changes were implemented:
The tournament was expanded from 38 to 47 teams.
A total of 10 teams eliminated from the Copa Libertadores (two best teams eliminated in the third stage of qualifying and eight third-placed teams in the group stage) were transferred to the Copa Sudamericana.
The schedule of the tournament was extended to year-round so it would start in late January or early February and conclude in late November or early December.

Although CONMEBOL proposed to change the format of the final to be played as a single match at a venue to be chosen in advance, they later decided to keep the two-legged home-and-away format.

On 18 November 2016, the Liga MX president Enrique Bonilla announced that teams from Mexico would not participate in the 2017 Copa Libertadores due to the format change which put it in conflict with the Mexican league schedule. However, he left open the possibility of a return as soon as 2018 if a solution was found.

Initially CONMEBOL announced that the tournament would be expanded from 38 to 44 teams, and the additional six berths would be distributed to the Copa Sudamericana champions (which no longer occupy one of the places allocated to their association and are now allocated an additional berth), two to Brazil, and one each to Argentina, Chile and Colombia, based on commercial and sporting criteria. Following the withdrawal of teams from Mexico, CONMEBOL announced that the other six associations (Bolivia, Ecuador, Paraguay, Peru, Uruguay and Venezuela) would also be each allocated an additional berth, further expanding the tournament to 47 teams.

From this season, the Copa Libertadores champions (which no longer occupy one of the group stage places allocated to their association) and the Copa Sudamericana champions gained direct entries into the group stage, meaning a total of 28 teams (increased from 26) would directly enter the group stage, while the other four berths (decreased from six) would be decided by the qualifying stages. The group stage berths left vacant following the withdrawal of teams from Mexico would be redistributed to Argentina and Brazil. For the qualifying stages, a total of 19 teams (increased from 12) competed in three rounds where the four winners advanced to the group stage (initially 16 teams would compete in two rounds before further expansion following the withdrawal of teams from Mexico).

Teams
The following 47 teams from the 10 CONMEBOL member associations qualified for the tournament:
Copa Libertadores champions
Copa Sudamericana champions
Brazil: 7 berths
Argentina: 6 berths
All other associations: 4 berths each

The entry stage is determined as follows:
Group stage: 28 teams
Copa Libertadores champions
Copa Sudamericana champions
Teams which qualified for berths 1–5 from Argentina and Brazil
Teams which qualified for berths 1–2 from all other associations
Second stage: 13 teams
Teams which qualified for berths 6–7 from Brazil
Team which qualified for berth 6 from Argentina
Teams which qualified for berths 3–4 from Chile and Colombia
Teams which qualified for berths 3 from all other associations
First stage: 6 teams
Teams which qualified for berths 4 from Bolivia, Ecuador, Paraguay, Peru, Uruguay and Venezuela

Schedule
The schedule of the competition is as follows. The first stage matches are played on Monday and Friday, instead of the usual midweek of Tuesday, Wednesday or Thursday.

Draws

Qualifying stages

First stage

Second stage

Third stage

Copa Sudamericana qualification

Group stage

Group 1

Group 2

Group 3

Group 4

Group 5

Group 6

Group 7

Group 8

Final stages

Seeding

Bracket

Round of 16

Quarterfinals

Semifinals

Finals

Statistics

Top scorers

Top assists

See also
 2017 FIFA Club World Cup
 2017 Copa Sudamericana
 2018 Recopa Sudamericana

References

External links
 
CONMEBOL Libertadores Bridgestone 2017, CONMEBOL.com 

 
2017
1